Pralayanthaka is a 1984 Indian Kannada-language film,  directed by B. Subba Rao and produced by N. Veeraswamy. The film stars V. Ravichandran, Bhavya, Jai Jagadish, Rajeev and Vijay Kashi. The film has musical score by Shankar–Ganesh. The film was a remake of Tamil film Theerppu En Kaiyil.

Cast

V. Ravichandran
Bhavya
Arjun Sarja in Guest Appearance
Ambika in Special Appearance
Jai Jagadish
Rajeev
Vijay Kashi
Kanchana
Vedaprada
Mukhyamantri Chandru
Lokanath
Shakti Prasad
Rajanand
N. S. Rao
M. S. Umesh
Lakshman
Dingri Nagaraj
Gode Lakshminarayana
Thyagaraj Urs
Master Chethan

Soundtrack
The music was composed by Shankar–Ganesh. The song "Munde Nee Hodaga" was reused from composers's own song "Ennadi Muniyamma" which they had composed for Tamil film Vaanga Mappillai Vaanga.

References

1984 films
1980s Kannada-language films
Films scored by Shankar–Ganesh
Indian action films
Kannada remakes of Tamil films